The Castle of Clavijo, one of the most famous in the area of La Rioja, Spain, is located on top of an imposing rock, dominating the surrounding land in the municipality of the same name in La Rioja, 15 km from the capital, Logroño.

External links

 at CastillosNet
 about La Rioja

Buildings and structures in La Rioja (Spain)
Castles in La Rioja